Zlín District is a district (okres) within the Zlín Region of the Czech Republic. Its capital is the city of Zlín.

List of municipalities
Bělov -
Biskupice -
Bohuslavice nad Vláří -
Bohuslavice u Zlína -
Bratřejov -
Březnice -
Březová -
Březůvky -
Brumov-Bylnice -
Dešná -
Dobrkovice -
Dolní Lhota -
Doubravy -
Drnovice -
Držková -
Fryšták -
Halenkovice -
Haluzice -
Horní Lhota -
Hostišová -
Hřivínův Újezd -
Hrobice -
Hvozdná -
Jasenná -
Jestřabí -
Kaňovice -
Karlovice -
Kašava -
Kelníky -
Komárov -
Křekov -
Lhota -
Lhotsko -
Lípa -
Lipová -
Loučka -
Ludkovice -
Luhačovice -
Lukov -
Lukoveček -
Lutonina -
Machová -
Mysločovice -
Napajedla -
Návojná -
Nedašov -
Nedašova Lhota -
Neubuz -
Oldřichovice -
Ostrata -
Otrokovice -
Petrůvka -
Podhradí -
Podkopná Lhota -
Pohořelice -
Poteč -
Pozlovice -
Provodov -
Racková -
Rokytnice -
Rudimov -
Šanov -
Šarovy -
Sazovice -
Sehradice -
Slavičín -
Slopné -
Slušovice -
Spytihněv -
Štítná nad Vláří-Popov -
Študlov - 
Tečovice -
Tichov -
Tlumačov -
Trnava -
Ublo -
Újezd -
Valašské Klobouky -
Valašské Příkazy - 
Velký Ořechov -
Veselá -
Vizovice -
Vlachova Lhota -
Vlachovice -
Vlčková -
Všemina -
Vysoké Pole -
Zádveřice-Raková -
Želechovice nad Dřevnicí -
Zlín -
Žlutava

References

 
Districts of the Czech Republic